Ballynahone may refer to the following places in Northern Ireland:

Ballynahone Beg, Maghera civil parish
Ballynahone Bog
Ballynahone More

References